The men's individual pursuit class C5 track cycling event at the 2020 Summer Paralympics took place on 27 August 2021 at the Izu Velodrome, Japan. This class is for cyclists who have impairments that affect their legs, arms, and/or trunk but are still capable to use a standard bicycle. 10 cyclists from 6 defferent nations competed in this event.

Competition format
The competition starts with a qualifying round where all 10 cyclists are divided into 4 heats, each heat containing 2 cyclists in it; they will then compete on a time trial basis. The 2 fastest in the qualifying round would qualify to the gold medal final while the 3rd and 4th fastest will qualify to the bronze medal final. The distance of this event is 4000m. The event finals will be held on the same day as the qualifying round.

Schedule
All times are Japan Standard Time (UTC+9)

Records

Results

Qualifying

Finals

References

Men's individual pursuit C5